The 1954–55 season was Newport County's eighth consecutive season in the Third Division South since relegation from the Second Division at the end of the 1946–47 season. It was the club's 26th season in the third tier and 27th season overall in the Football League.

Season review

Results summary

Results by round

Fixtures and results

Third Division South

FA Cup

Welsh Cup

League table

External links
 Newport County 1954-1955 : Results
 Newport County football club match record: 1955
 Welsh Cup 1954/55

References

 Amber in the Blood: A History of Newport County. 

1954-55
English football clubs 1954–55 season
1954–55 in Welsh football